John Wright is an ACE-certified film editor.

Wright has received two Academy Award nominations for his work on The Hunt for Red October (1990) and Speed (1994). He has worked twice with director Mel Gibson, editing The Passion of the Christ and Apocalypto.

Filmography

 The Bad News Bears (1976)
 Acapulco Gold (1976)
 Dogs (1976)
 Convoy (1978)
 Separate Ways (1981)
 Only When I Laugh (1981)
 Frances (1982)
 Mass Appeal (1984)
 Explorers (1985)
 The Running Man (1987)
 Gleaming the Cube (1989)
 Sea of Love (1989)
 The Hunt for Red October (1990)
 Teenage Mutant Ninja Turtles II: The Secret of the Ooze (1991)
 Necessary Roughness (1991)
 Freejack (1992)
 Last Action Hero (1993)
 Speed (1994)
 Die Hard with a Vengeance (1995)
 Broken Arrow (1996)
 Deep Rising (1998)
 The Thomas Crown Affair (1999)
 The 13th Warrior (1999)
 X-Men (2000)
 Rollerball (2002)
 The Passion of the Christ (2004)
 Glory Road (2006)
 Apocalypto (2006)
 The Incredible Hulk (2008)
 Secretariat (2010)
 A Belfast Story (2013)
 Heaven Is for Real (2014)

External links

American Cinema Editors
American film editors
Best Editing BAFTA Award winners
Year of birth missing (living people)
Living people